Los Bandoleros Reloaded is two-CD best-of album presented by Don Omar, released on November 21, 2006. The album includes five tracks performed by Omar, where other performers include Cosculluela, Wisin & Yandel, Naldo, Yaga & Mackie, Baby Ranks, Glory and more.

Track listing

Disc 1 
"Intro" (Gallego) - 4:00
"Anda Sola" (Don Omar) (Produced by DJ Memo) - 2:58
"My Space" (Don Omar, Wisin & Yandel) (Produced by Nely, Eliel) - 3:43
"La Vecinita" (Vico C) - 4:27
"Mángala" (Mario VI) - 2:48
"Baila Sola" (Franco "El Gorila") (Produced by Doble A & Nales) - 3:44
"Cae la Luna" (Valentino) - 3:26
"Tú Pa' Tras y Yo Pa' Lante" (Voltio) - 3:18
"Buscándote" (Jomar) (Produced by Mambo Kingz) - 3:14
"El Señor de la Noche" (Don Omar) - 2:56
"El Bandolero" (Cosculluela) - 3:13
"Como Hacer" (Gocho) - 3:13
"Convéncete" (Naldo) (Produced by Nesty, Victor) - 3:14
"Acción" (Yaga & Mackie featuring Jeyko "El Padrote") - 3:15
"Te Recordaré" (Lennox, Norrys) - 3:02

Disc 2 
"Se Transporta" (Marvin) - 3:25
"Sicario" (Mero) - 3:28
"Quema, Quema" (Aldo & Dandy) (Produced by DJ Memo)  - 3:39
"Declaro" (Manny Montes, Redimi2) - 4:42
"Estás Calentándome" (Baby Ranks) (Produced by Luny Tunes, Tainy) - 4:16
"Atácalos" (Rey Pirin) - 3:49
"Chica de Batalla" (Yo-Seph "The One") (Produced by Doble A & Nales) - 3:27
"No Te Obligo" (Alex Killer) - 3:25
"Ella Anda Sola" (Andy Boy) - 3:22
"Química II" (Wiso G) (Produced by Rafi Mercenario)  - 3:25
"Chouchianna" (Glory) - 3:12
"Dios Te Libre" (TNT) - 4:21
"A lo Loco" (Roka & Gami) - 3:23
"Yo No Me Dejo" (Don Omar) (bonus track 1) - 4:00 - Diss track to Daddy Yankee
"9/11/06" (Don Omar, Rell) (bonus track 2) - 3:09 - Diss track to Daddy Yankee

DVD
"Don Omar" (Bandolero's on the road)

Charts

References 

2006 compilation albums
2006 video albums
Albums produced by Luny Tunes
Albums produced by Rafy Mercenario
Don Omar compilation albums